Bendel Island (Also known as: Morse Island) is an island located in the Aleutians East Borough, Gulf of Alaska, Southwest of mainland Alaska, United States. The island is part of an island group named the Shumagin Islands, which consist of 20 islands, and lies between the islands of Big Koniuji and Nagai.

History 
The island was named by W. H. Dall of the US Coast & Geodetic Survey for Bernhard Bendel, an Alaskan trader, in either 1871 or 1872. It first appeared on the USCGS charts in 1888. It was also mentioned in a US Bureau of Fisheries report that same year. The island was marked as Morse Island on an USCGS chart in 1891.

Geography 
It lies at these coordinates: . The nearest city to Bendel Island is Sand Point, located on Popof Island some  Northwest of Bendel Island. The island is part of the Northeast Aleutian Range.

Climate

See also 
 List of islands of Alaska

References 

Shumagin Islands
Aleutian Range
Islands of Alaska
Islands of the United States
Islands of Aleutians East Borough, Alaska